"Síguelo" is a single by Puerto Rican reggaeton duo Wisin & Yandel from the re-edition album Los Extraterrestres: Otra Dimensión, released on July 25, 2008 by Machete Music. The official remix features former WY Records singer Jayko.

Samples
 The song samples the famous James Brown "Woo! Yeah!" loop throughout the song. Due to this feature the song gathered popularity when released.

To avoid lawsuits, The song no longer contains the sample. The song has been edited from its original version on all streaming and music stores online.

Charts

Weekly charts

Year-end charts

Accolades

American Society of Composers, Authors, and Publishers Awards

|-
|rowspan="1" scope="row"|2009
|Síguelo
|Urban Song of the Year
|
|-

References

External links
 "Síguelo" - Official music video at YouTube.

2008 singles
Wisin & Yandel songs
Music videos directed by Jessy Terrero
2008 songs
Songs written by Nesty (producer)